Çanakkale Province is a province of Turkey, located in the northwestern part of the country. It takes its name from the city of Çanakkale.

Like Istanbul, Çanakkale province has a European (Thrace) and an Asian (Anatolia) part. The European part is formed by the Gallipoli (Gelibolu) peninsula, while the Asian part is largely coterminous with the historic region of Troad in Anatolia. They are separated by the Dardanelles strait, connecting the Sea of Marmara and the Aegean Sea.

The archaeological site of Troy is found in Çanakkale province.

Çanakkale is the biggest district of the province. The European and Asian parts of the province were connected to each other with the completion of the Çanakkale 1915 Bridge in March 2022.

History
In the early Turkish Republic, the Çanakkale Province came into existence with the abolition of the Ottoman-era sanjaks of Biga and Gelibolu. According to a population census in 1927, Çanakkale had 8,500 inhabitants, except its neighbouring villages. It is recorded that Çanakkale, which was also called as "Hellespontos" and "Dardanelles" in ancient times, has accommodated to many civilizations for about 3,000 years. Even the Archaic Troy (Troia) city, where was governed by Lydians and destroyed by the devastating earthquake in 2500 BC, has ruins in today. In 336 BC, Persian Empire which became the crucial power in Anatolia and was conducted by Alexander the Great that aimed to extend ancient Greece all over the world, was defeated. Also with the ruin of the Anatolian beylik of Karesi, most of the territory of Çanakkale was conquered in the Ottoman era, with the assistance of the castles in remuneration for helping to Byzantine Empire, locating Gelibolu. Afterwards, the Çanakkale strait was given to the Ottoman Empire.

The province was included in the Second Inspectorate General on the 19 February 1934 which span over the provinces of Edirne, Çanakkale, Kırklareli, Tekirdağ. It was ruled by an Inspector General who had wide-ranging authorities over civilian, military and educational matters. The office of the Inspectorate-General was abandoned in 1948 but the legal framework of the Inspectorate-Generals was only abolished in 1952, under the Government of the Democrat Party.

Agriculture
The province of Çanakkale is a notable region for viticulture and winemaking in Turkey. The region between Saros Gulf and Gelibolu on the Gallipoli peninsula is cultivated with vineyards. Wine producer "Suvla" is located in Suvla.

Environment
 several of the country's coal fired power stations are here, some with smokestack filters which do not meet regulations.

Districts

Çanakkale province is divided into 12 districts (capital district in bold):

Gallery

See also
List of populated places in Çanakkale Province

References

External links

  Çanakkale governor's official website
  Çanakkale Belediyesi
  Çanakkale
  Çanakkale weather forecast information
  Pictures of the capital of the province and its sights

 
Provinces of Turkey